The following is a list of notable alumni, faculty and affiliates of University of Guelph in Canada.

Chancellors
At its first convocation on May 21, 1965 George Drew was installed as chancellor of the University.

George Drew (1965–1971)
Emmett Matthew Hall (1971–1977)
Pauline Mills McGibbon (1977–1983)
William Atcheson Stewart (1983–1989             

Lincoln Alexander (1991–2007)
Pamela Wallin (2007–2011)
David Mirvish (2012–2017)
Martha Billes (2017–2022)
Mary Anne Chambers (2022–present)

Presidents
John Douglas MacLachlan (1964–1967)
William Winegard (1967–1975)
Donald Forster (1975–1983)
Burton Matthews (1983–1988)
Brian Segal (1988–1993)
Mordechai Rozanski (1993–2003)
Alastair Summerlee (2003–2014)
Franco Vaccarino (2014–2020)
Charlotte Yates (Interim) (2020–2021)
Charlotte Yates (2021–present)

Notable alumni
Edmund Abaka - professor of African history at the University of Miami
Allan Armitage – author and professor at the University of Georgia
Rupan Bal – Canadian–Indian YouTuber
Chris Banks – poet
Toby Barrett – politician, Member of Provincial Parliament for Haldimand—Norfolk
Alexandra Beaton – actress and dancer
Karen Beauchemin – research scientist
Deni Ellis Béchard – Canadian-American novelist
Jennifer Beech – Canadian television host
Laura Bertram – actress
Mark Bourrie – lawyer and journalist
Tim Bray – software developer and entrepreneur
 Sara Angelucci – artist and professor at Ryerson University
Harry Brightwell
Ryder Britton
Christa Brosseau
James Robert Brown
Krista Buecking
Tyler Clark Burke – artist, illustrator, designer, and writer
Kathy Butler
 Mikey Bustos
Cassie Campbell
Dom Cardillo
David Castle
Anna Chatterton
Laurel Schafer, Canada Research Chair in Catalyst Development
Dicki Chhoyang
George Chiang
Meredith Chivers
Olivia Chow
Reid Coolsaet
Claude Cormier
Anne Croy, Reproductive immunologist 
Elisabeth de Mariaffi
Diane Deans
Susan Dobson
Peter Donaldson
Maura Doyle, multimedia artist
Rick Ferraro
Graham Forsythe
James E. Fraser
Harry L. Garrigus
Nora Gould – poet
Tim Grant
Peter S. Gray
Michael Grimes (Associate Diploma 1920), Irish scientist and first Professor of Microbiology at University College Cork
Tara Hedican
Graham Henderson 
Stephen Hicks
Robert Horner
Nasrin Husseini – (MSc 2020) Afghani refugee advocate, veterinary researcher, and food activist
Alexis Jordan
David Joseph
Mark Lautens
Robert Leigh
Matt Lennox
Karen Ludwig
Judy Maddren
Charlie Masters
Brandon Maxwell
Tom McBroom
Scott McGillivray
Audrey McLaughlin
Heather McNairn
Gord Miller
K. D. Miller
Kenneth Mitchell
Kimberly Moffit
Peter Moss
Jacey Murphy
Ian Murray
Brendan Myers
Opendra Narayan
Piers Nash
Joe Neilands
Aleks Oniszczak
Penny Park
Kim Parlee
Roula Partheniou – artist
Cecil Frederick Patterson
David Peck
Mirela Rahneva
Lisa Raitt
Jordan Raycroft
Jus Reign – Canadian Comedian and YouTube Personality
Sue Richards
Jael Richardson
Doug Rollins
Liz Sandals
Dolph Schluter
James Schroder
H. B. Sharman
Kalidas Shetty
Vandana Shiva
Jane Siberry – singer / songwriter
Michael Sona – political figure
Ralph Spence
John Steffler
Derek Sullivan
Mary Swan
Marwan Tabbara
Stephen J. Tanner
Chase Tang - actor / mental health advocate 
Laura Thompson – musician / arts & entertainment reporter & producer
Lisa Thompson
Jane Urquhart
Dennis vanEngelsdorp – assistant professor at University of Maryland
Mike Wallace – politician
Hope Weiler – associate professor at McGill University
Terry Wilson – police officer
John Wise – politician
Jane Wright – entomologist
Elizabeth Yake – film producer
Jiyuan Yu – philosopher
 Liz Howard – poet and winner of the 2016 Griffin Poetry Prize for her book Infinite Citizen of the Shaking Tent
 Aisha Sasha John – poet
 Canisia Lubrin – poet
 Elisabeth de Mariaffi – novelist and short story writer
 Soraya Peerbaye – poet
 Ayelet Tsabari – novelist and winner of the Sami Rohr Prize
 Paul Vermeersch – poet
 Zoe Whittall – novelist and Canadian Screen Award-winning screenwriter
 Alissa York – novelist

 Edgar Archibald – agricultural scientist
George Atkins – broadcaster
Karen Bailey – scientist
 Roberta Bondar – Canada's first female astronaut
 Ernest Charles Drury – eighth Premier of Ontario
 John Kenneth Galbraith – economist
 Bill Hanley – Hockey Hall of Fame member
 George Stewart Henry – tenth Premier of Ontario
 Grant MacEwan – ninth Lieutenant Governor of Alberta
 H.R. MacMillan – forester, industrialist, wartime administrator, and philanthropist 
 Harry Nixon – thirteenth Premier of Ontario
 Stanley Thompson – golf course architect
Kelly Thornton – theatre director
 Lyle Vanclief – former Minister of Agriculture
 Emma-Jayne Wilson – jockey
 Charles Ambrose Zavitz – pioneered the development of soybeans for commercial use in Ontario
 Edmund Zavitz – pioneer in re-forestation in Ontario 
Donald Arthur Hatch — Canadian academic.
Cara Elizabeth Yar Khan – disability advocate, public speaker and United Nations humanitarian

References

https://www.guelphtoday.com/local-news/u-of-g-grad-lands-big-role-in-new-netflix-series-1660964

https://news.uoguelph.ca/2019/09/u-of-g-has-a-supervillain-grad/

https://www.guelphmercury.com/news-story/9603595-university-of-guelph-grad-lands-netflix-supervillian-role/

Guelph